St Mary Colechurch was a parish church in the City of London destroyed in the Great Fire of London in 1666 and not rebuilt.

History
The church was situated at the junction of Poultry and the south end of Old Jewry.

The  Great Fire of London of 1666 destroyed 86 of the 97 parish churches in the City of London. By 1670 a Rebuilding Act had been passed and a committee set up under of Sir Christopher Wren to plan the new parishes. Fifty-one were chosen, but St Mary Colechurch was one of the minority not to be rebuilt. The parish was united with St Mildred, Poultry, although the parishioners objected on the grounds that This was a noisy, crowded parish perpetually disturbed by carts and coaches, and wants sufficient place for burials.

When St Mildred's too was deemed surplus to requirements, following the passing of the 1860 Union of Benefices Act, it passed successively through partnerships with St Olave Jewry and St Margaret Lothbury. C. W. Pearce notes that the last traces of any building vanished in 1839 although a Parish Boundary Mark inside the Mercers’ Hall still exists.

A plaque commemorates the church on the southwest corner of Old Jewry. The site is currently occupied by the Alliance & Leicester at 82 Cheapside.

References

External links

Former buildings and structures in the City of London
Churches destroyed in the Great Fire of London and not rebuilt
Churches in the City of London
10th-century establishments in England
1666 disestablishments in England